Edward Craig may refer to:

 Edward Craig (philosopher) (born 1942), English academic and cricketer
 Edward Craig (politician) (1896–1979), Californian politician, 1929–1937
 Edward A. Craig (1896–1994), US Marine officer
 Edward Anthony Craig (1905–1998), British theatre designer, known as Edward Carrick
 Edward Gordon Craig (1872–1966), modernist theatre practitioner
 Edward Hubert Cunningham Craig (1874–1946), geologist and cartographer
 Ted Craig (born 1948), Australian-born theatre director
 Teddy Craig (active 1924–1930), Scottish footballer

See also
 Edward Craig Mazique (1911–1987), African-American physician in Washington, D. C.
 Edward Craig Morris (1939–2006), American archaeologist

Craig (surname)